The Information and Communications Technology Council was founded in 1992 as the Software Human Resources Council one of 31 sector councils funded in part by the Government of Canada's Sector Council Program.  The organization adopted its new name in October 2006 to reflect an expanded mandate.

In 1998, the Software Human Resources Council was implicated in the controversial Software Development Worker Pilot Project, a program that allowed the Canadian Department of Citizenship and Immigration to fast-track the visa applications of foreign workers. The story was covered in a paper by Dr. Alasdair Roberts titled "Making Policy Behind Closed Doors", which criticized the Department of Human Resources Development Canada for allegedly handling this project in such a way as to allow for fast-tracking of visa applications. The paper argued that the Canadian government handed decision-making to Software Human Resources Council and the Information and Communications Technology Council.

According to a 2003 story by Juliet O'Neill in The Ottawa Citizen, the Canadian federal government gave $1.1-million to the Software Human Resources Council for the development and dissemination of the Information Technology-industry labour market information. The story covered the lives of tech workers who lost their jobs after the disappearance of jobs in the tech industry in the early part of the 21st century.

In 2005, the Software Human Resources Council was supported by $2 million from the Canadian federal government

Over the years the Software Human Resources Council evolved, and once the Canadian Government began to stop funding the sector councils, the organization re-branded to become the Information and Communications Technology Council.

The Information and Communications Technology Council provides:
 emerging technology research
 labour market intelligence and economic analysis
 career awareness, capacity building solutions and professional development
 consumer research
 policy advice

Board of directors
Officers
Dr. Thomas P. Keenan - Professor, Faculty of Environmental Design, University of Calgary (Chair)
Andrew Wishart - Deloitte (Vice-Chair)
Trekker Armstong - FCIPS, I.S.P. (ret.), ITCP (Treasurer)
Faye West - West Consulting (Secretary)

Directors
Gary Davenport - CIO Association of Canada (Past President)
Jamie Darch - Jamie Darch & Associates (Honorary Director)
Keith A. Sinclair - Harris Leadership Strategies
John Weigelt - Microsoft Canada
Neil Knudsen - Meridian Networks
Jack Noppé
Hana Pika - University of Ottawa Heart Institute
Pina Marra - Desjardins Group

References

Information technology organizations based in Canada
Lobbying organizations in Canada
Professional associations based in Canada